Dawn Ng (born 1982) is a multi-hyphenate visual artist from Singapore. She works across a diverse breadth of mediums, motives and scale ranging from text, illustration, collage, light, sculpture to large scale installations. Her work primarily deals with time, memory, and the ephemeral. To date, Dawn was part of the Jeju Biennale in 2017, participated in the inaugural Art Basel Hong Kong with her solo, SIXTEEN, followed by A Thing of Beauty, at the Art Paris Art Fair at the Grand Palais in 2015. She has also shown in Sydney, Shanghai, and Jakarta.

Well known for her ubiquitous Walter series  that garnered attention for its controversial guerilla content and form, the work was acquired into the permanent collection of the Singapore Art Museum, included in Open Sea at the 2015 Musée d'art contemporain de Lyon which explored the contemporary Art scene of Southeast Asia. In 2019, the artist was commissioned to fill a wing of the Art Science Museum for their Floating Utopias exhibition.

In 2016 Ng was commissioned by the Fondation d'enterprise Hermes to inaugurate their Singapore flagship's art gallery with a solo installation, How to Disappear into a Rainbow as the store reopened in Liat Towers, Singapore. Most recently the artist opened a commissioned solo at the Asian Civilisations Museum in 2020.

Dawn Ng majored in Journalism and Studio Art at Georgetown University in Washington D.C., and the Slade School of Fine Art in London. She is represented by Sullivan+Strumpf, Singapore.

Solo exhibitions 
2021, Into Air, Sullivan+Strumpf, Singapore

2020, Monument Momento, Sullivan+Strumpf, S.E.A Focus, Singapore

2019, 11, Telok Ayer Arts Club, Singapore

2018, Perfect Stranger, Sullivan+Strumpf, Sydney

2018, Perfect Stranger, Chan + Hori Contemporary, Singapore

2016, How to Disappear into a Rainbow, Hermes Aloft Gallery, Singapore

2015, A Thing of Beauty, Art Paris Art Fair

The photographic series A Thing of Beauty captures installations of small, locally sourced objects, collected from a range of stores in residential Singapore – from bakeries to convenience stores.

2013, Sixteen, Art Basel Hong Kong

Sixteen is an installation of 16 wooden chests built in a spectrum of colors. These chests are crafted to resemble treasure boxes, which fit one inside the other — the largest, the size of an oversized antique travel trunk, down to the smallest, the size of a musical box. Each chest is labeled both on the outside and on the inside with brass-engraved plaques, whose texts relate to the colour of it.

2012, Everything You Ever Wanted Is Right Here, Chan Hampe Galleries, Singapore

2011, Walter, Singapore Art Museum

This series of photographs by Dawn Ng features a curious colossal bunny named Walter that pops up across Singapore's standard landscape of flats and heartland enclaves. By placing Walter at various spots in Singapore and photographing these interesting scenarios in which the giant rabbit contrasts with his environment, the artist encourages people to re-examine overlooked places, local sites, and sights.

Group exhibitions 
2020, Merry-Go-Round, Twenty Twenty Art Show, Singapore

2019, Waterfall I, Sullivan+Strumpf, Westbund Art & Design, Shanghai

2017, Dorothy, Jeju Biennale, Korea

References 

Living people
Singaporean artists
Singaporean women artists
Singaporean installation artists
Raffles Institution alumni
Georgetown University alumni
Alumni of the Slade School of Fine Art
Singaporean people of Chinese descent
1982 births